Zinc finger protein 843 is a protein that in humans is encoded by the ZNF843 gene.

References

Further reading